Diego Abraham González Torres (born 29 April 1998) is a Chilean footballer who plays as a defender for Chilean Primera División side O'Higgins.

Club career
González made his professional debut playing for O'Higgins in a Liguilla Pre-Sudamericana match against Santiago Wanderers on May 15, 2016. On 2017 season, he was loaned to Brazilian side Palmeiras on a deal for a year with an option to buy. Later, on 2019 season he was loaned to Primera B side Rangers de Talca.

International career
He represented Chile U17 at the 2015 South American U-17 Championship and at the 2015 FIFA U-17 World Cup. In addition, he was part of the Chile U20 squad for the 2017 South American U-20 Championship, but he didn't make any appearance.

At senior level, on 2019 he was called up to a training microcycle of the Chile senior team.

Personal life
He is the older brother of Moisés González, a professional footballer who began his career playing for O'Higgins along with him.

References

External links

1998 births
Living people
People from Rancagua
Chilean footballers
Chile youth international footballers
Chile under-20 international footballers
Chilean Primera División players
Primera B de Chile players
O'Higgins F.C. footballers
Sociedade Esportiva Palmeiras players
Rangers de Talca footballers
Association football defenders